Fakola is a small town and commune in the Cercle of Kolondieba in the Sikasso Region of southern Mali. In 1998 the commune had a population of 14,301.

References

Communes of Sikasso Region